Asahel Finch, Jr., (February 14, 1809April 4, 1883) was an American lawyer, politician, and pioneer of Michigan and Wisconsin.  He was a member of the Michigan House of Representatives, representing Lenawee County during the 1837 session.

Biography
Born in Genoa, New York, Asahel Finch Jr. married Mary De Forest Bristol in 1830 and they moved to Adrian, Michigan. He began studying law in 1834, and was admitted to the Michigan bar in 1838.

He served in the Michigan House of Representatives in 1837, then resigned before the end of his term, and moved to Milwaukee, Wisconsin, in 1839, where he opened a law firm (now Foley & Lardner) with William Pitt Lynde. In 1867, Finch unsuccessfully ran for Mayor of Milwaukee.

Initially a Whig, he aided in the creation of the Republican Party and supported John C. Frémont for President in 1856.

He died in Milwaukee on April 4, 1883.

References

External links

1809 births
1883 deaths
People from Adrian, Michigan
People from Genoa, New York
Politicians from Milwaukee
Members of the Michigan House of Representatives
Michigan lawyers
Wisconsin lawyers
19th-century American politicians
Michigan Whigs
Wisconsin Republicans
19th-century American lawyers